Rural Non Farm Development Agency (RUDA) is an agency of  the Government of Rajasthan established in  1995 to promote the Rural Non-Farm Sector (RNFS) in Rajasthan state. It promotes sustainable rural livelihoods in the rural non farm sector.

References

State agencies of Rajasthan
Rural development organisations in India
1995 establishments in Rajasthan